Alexandrea Martin (born May 9, 1974) is an American actress and film producer. She was awarded the title of Miss Golden Globe at the 1994 Golden Globe Awards.

Personal life
Alexandrea Martin is the daughter of Whoopi Goldberg and her first husband, Alvin Martin.

Martin has three children: daughters Amara and Jerzey, and son Mason. Her first pregnancy was by a half-Vietnamese, half-black high school fling. The family completely abandoned HJ, her first daughter's father, after he went to prison at a young age. The two met while Whoopi lived in Berkeley.  Her second and third pregnancies were by her then-husband, Bernard Dean, whom she later divorced. Martin and Dean remarried on October 15, 2011. She became a grandmother in 2014.

Filmography

References

External links

Living people
African-American actresses
African-American film producers
American film producers
American film actresses
Place of birth missing (living people)
American people of Bissau-Guinean descent
20th-century American actresses
21st-century American actresses
American women film producers
20th-century African-American women
20th-century African-American people
21st-century African-American women
21st-century African-American people
1974 births